Ducrow is a surname. Notable people with the surname include:

Andrew Ducrow (1793–1842), British circus performer
Ulrich Duchrow (born 1935), professor of systematic theology